Brigidine College Randwick is an independent Roman Catholic secondary day school for girls located in Randwick, an eastern suburb of Sydney, New South Wales, Australia.

History 
The College was founded by the Brigidine Sisters in September 1901. The Congregation of Brigidine Sisters, founded in Ireland by Bishop Daniel Delaney in 1807, has as their motto "Fortiter et Suaviter", translated as "With Strength and Gentleness". Based upon the Delaney family crest, the unique Brigid's cross and the Lamp of Learning are incorporated into this worldwide Brigidine symbol.

Academic 
Brigidine College did very well in the 2007 HSC. The school ranked 30th in the state for English, with 100% of the students in Advanced English, English Extension 1 and Extension 2 being placed in the top two bands.

Half of the Visual Arts HSC students were nominated for ARTexpress, an art exhibition that showcases works of Higher School Certificate Visual Arts student works.

Notable alumni 
 Dr Angelica Merlot — NHMRC, CINSW and UNSW Scientia Research Fellow, recipient of the 2019 NSW Woman of the Year Award, and Australia's youngest recipient of a National Health and Medical Research Council Grant.
 C. Moore Hardy - photographer
 Samantha Noble - actress
 Vanessa Panousis - basketball player
 Helen Quach - music conductor
 Professor Renae Ryan — Academic Director of the Science in Australia Gender Equity (SAGE) Program at University of Sydney.
 Dr Ella Stack — First Lord Mayor of Darwin
 Jessica Thornton — Track and Field Sprinter: 2016 Summer Olympics

See also 

 List of non-government schools in New South Wales

References

External links
Brigidine College Randwick | Home

Catholic secondary schools in Sydney
Brigidine schools
Girls' schools in New South Wales
1901 establishments in Australia
Educational institutions established in 1901
Randwick, New South Wales